Marie Nordén (born 1967) is a Swedish social democratic politician. She has been a member of the Riksdag from 2006 and until 2014.

In 2015, Nordén was appointed Secretary General for the National Society for Road Safety.

External links
Marie Nordén at the Riksdag website

Members of the Riksdag from the Social Democrats
Living people
1967 births
Women members of the Riksdag
Members of the Riksdag 2002–2006
21st-century Swedish women politicians
Members of the Riksdag 2006–2010
Members of the Riksdag 2010–2014